White antelope may refer to:

Addax, an antelope
Robin Pecknold, a musician associated with the indie folk band Fleet Foxes